The Buffalo Creek Flood: An Act of Man is a 1975 documentary film produced by Appalshop. The film is about the Buffalo Creek Flood, an incident that occurred on February 26, 1972 when the Pittston Coal Company's coal slurry impoundment dam in Logan County, West Virginia  burst four days after having been declared 'satisfactory' by a federal mine inspector. The film includes interviews with survivors, mining officials, and union representatives, along with footage of the flood itself.

In 2005, this film was selected for preservation in the United States National Film Registry by the Library of Congress as being "culturally, historically, or aesthetically significant".

See also
 List of American films of 1975

References

External links
Buffalo Creek Flood: An Act of Man essay by Mimi Pickering on the National Film Registry website. 
Buffalo Creek Flood: An Act of Man essay by Daniel Eagan in America's Film Legacy: The Authoritative Guide to the Landmark Movies in the National Film Registry, A&C Black, 2010 , pages 720-722 

1975 films
American short documentary films
1970s short documentary films
United States National Film Registry films
Documentary films about United States history
Documentary films about coal in the United States
Documentary films about disasters
1975 documentary films
Environmental disasters in the United States
Disasters in West Virginia
1970s English-language films
1970s American films